Kasséré is a town in northern Ivory Coast. It is a sub-prefecture and commune of Boundiali Department in Bagoué Region, Savanes District.

In 2014, the population of the sub-prefecture of Kasséré was 23,983.

Villages
The 11 villages of the sub-prefecture of Kasséré and their population in 2014 are:

Notes

Sub-prefectures of Bagoué
Communes of Bagoué